Arthur Michael Feldman (born 1949) is an American cardiologist and the Laura H. Carnell Professor of Medicine in the Lewis Katz School of Medicine at Temple University, known for his research on heart failure. Among his previous positions include Harry S. Tack Professor and Chief of the Division of Cardiology at the University of Pittsburgh, Magee Chair of the Department of Medicine at Jefferson Medical College, and Executive Dean of the Lewis Katz School of Medicine. He was the founding editor-in-chief of Clinical and Translational Science and the Journal of Clinical and Translational Science. In 2019, he received the Distinguished Scientist Award-Basic Domain from the American College of Cardiology.

References

External links
Faculty page

Living people
1949 births
Gettysburg College alumni
Louisiana State University alumni
Temple University faculty
American cardiologists
University of Pittsburgh faculty
Jefferson Medical College faculty
Medical journal editors